The Kahuzi swamp shrew (Myosorex jejei) is a species of mammal in the family Soricidae found in the Democratic Republic of the Congo. Its natural habitat is swampland.

References

Myosorex
Mammals described in 2010
Taxonomy articles created by Polbot
Endemic fauna of the Democratic Republic of the Congo